Bash Bolagh (also Romanized as Bāsh Bolāgh; also known as  Bash-Bulag, Bāshbūlāgh, and Bāshbulāq) is a village in Kaghazkonan-e Markazi Rural District, Kaghazkonan District, Meyaneh County, East Azerbaijan Province, Iran. At the 2006 census, its population was 24, in 8 families.

References 

Populated places in Meyaneh County